Chad Austin Fincher (born 1974) is an American politician from Semmes, Alabama. He served as a member of the Alabama State House of Representatives from 2006 until 2014.

Biography
Fincher, born in Mobile County, Alabama, is a graduate of Auburn University with Bachelor of Science in Forestry Operations, and is a registered Forester with the State of Alabama.

He is currently the Owner of Fincher and Associates Realty, and is a licensed Realtor in the states of Alabama and Mississippi. He has practiced real estate for over 15 years.

Legislative history
Fincher currently serves as chairman on the House Agriculture and Forestry Committee. 
Other committees Fincher serves on include:
House Ways and Means Committee 
 Mobile County Delegation Committee
 Water Policy and Management Joint Legislative Committee
 Joint Legislative Committee on State Parks
 Housing Finance Authority Legislative Oversight Committee
 Permanent Joint Legislative Committee on Energy Policy
 Southern Legislative Conferences Agriculture and Rural Development Committee
 Southern Regional Education Board Legislative Advisory Council

Education reform
In the 2013 Legislative Session, Fincher sponsored the School Flexibility Act, now known (after a controversial rewrite to encompass private school vouchers) as the Alabama Accountability Act, which established flexibility contracts between the State Board of Education and local school districts, and establishes a scholarship program for children in failing schools as well as taxpayer funds for private schools.

2013 congressional campaign

Fincher ran in a 2013 special election to represent  in the United States House of Representatives, following Jo Bonner's retirement. Fincher finished third in the Republican primary, behind Bradley Byrne and Dean Young.  In his concession speech he described himself as a social and fiscal conservative.

References

Republican Party members of the Alabama House of Representatives
Living people
1974 births
People from Semmes, Alabama
Date of birth missing (living people)